Sinognathus is an extinct genus of gomphodont cynodonts from the Middle Triassic Ermaying Formation of China. Its type and only species is Sinognathus gracilis, which was named in 1959 by the Chinese palaeontologist C. C. Young.

References 

Cynognathians
Prehistoric cynodont genera
Anisian life
Middle Triassic synapsids
Triassic China
Fossils of China
Fossil taxa described in 1959
Taxa named by Yang Zhongjian